Troy weight is a system of units of mass that originated in 15th-century England, and is primarily used in the precious metals industry. The troy weight units are the grain, the pennyweight (24 grains), the troy ounce (20 pennyweights), and the troy pound (12 troy ounces). The troy grain is equal to the grain unit of the avoirdupois system, but the troy ounce is heavier than the avoirdupois ounce, and the troy pound is lighter than the avoirdupois pound. One troy ounce (oz t) equals exactly 31.1034768 grams.

Etymology
Troy weight probably takes its name from the French market town of Troyes where English merchants traded at least as early as the early 9th century. The name troy is first attested in 1390, describing the weight of a platter, in an account of the travels in Europe of the Earl of Derby.

Charles Moore Watson (1844–1916) proposes an alternative etymology:  The Assize of Weights and Measures (also known as ), one of the statutes of uncertain date from the reign of either Henry III or Edward I, thus before 1307, specifies ""—which the Public Record Commissioners translate as "troy weight".  The word  refers to markets.  Watson finds the dialect word troi, meaning a balance in Wright's The English Dialect Dictionary.  Troy weight referred to the tower system; the earliest reference to the modern troy weights is in 1414.

History
Many aspects of the troy weight system were indirectly derived from the Roman monetary system. Before they used coins, early Romans used bronze bars of varying weights as currency. An  ("heavy bronze") weighed one pound. Before the adoption of the metric system, many systems of troy weights were in use in various parts of Europe, among them Holland troy, Paris troy, etc. Their values varied from one another by up to several percentage points. Troy weights were first used in England in the 15th century, and were made official for gold and silver in 1527. The British Imperial system of weights and measures (also known as Imperial units) was established in 1824, prior to which the troy weight system was a subset of pre-Imperial English units.

The troy ounce in use today is essentially the same as the British Imperial troy ounce (1824–1971), adopted as an official weight standard for United States coinage by Act of Congress on May 19, 1828.
The British Imperial troy ounce (known more commonly simply as the imperial troy ounce) was based on, and virtually identical with, the pre-1824 British troy ounce and the pre-1707 English troy ounce. (1824 was the year the British Imperial system of weights and measures was adopted, 1707 was the year of the Act of Union which created the Kingdom of Great Britain.) Troy ounces have been used in England since about 1400 and the English troy ounce was officially adopted for coinage in 1527. Before that time, various sorts of troy ounces were in use on the continent.

The troy ounce and grain were also part of the apothecaries' system. This was long used in medicine, but has now been largely replaced by the metric system (milligrams).

The only troy weight in widespread use today is the British Imperial troy ounce and its American counterpart. Both are currently based on a grain of 0.06479891 gram (exact, by definition), with 480 grains to a troy ounce (compared with  grains for an ounce avoirdupois).

The British Empire abolished the 12-ounce troy pound in the 19th century, though it has been retained (although rarely used) in the American system. Larger amounts of precious metals are conventionally counted in hundreds or thousands of troy ounces (or in kilograms).

Origin
The origin of the troy weight system is unknown. Although the name probably comes from the Champagne fairs at Troyes, in northeastern France, the units themselves may be of more northern origin. English troy weights were nearly identical to the troy weight system of Bremen. (The Bremen troy ounce had a mass of 480.8 British Imperial grains.)

An alternative suggestion is that the weights come from the  Muslim domains by way of the gold dirhem (47.966 British Imperial grains), in the manner that King Offa's weights were derived from the silver dirhem (about 45.0 British grains).

According to Watson, troy relates to a dialect word troi (balance).  Then troy weight is a style of weighing, like auncel or bismar weights, or other kindred methods.  The troy weight then refers to weighing of small precious or potent goods, such as bullion and medicines.

Use in other countries
Troy ounces have been and are still often used in precious metal markets in countries that otherwise use International System of Units (SI), except in East Asia. However, the People's Bank of China has previously used troy measurements in minting Gold Pandas beginning in 1982; since 2016, the use of troy ounces has been replaced by integer numbers of grams.

Units of measurement

Troy pound (lb t) 

(An avoirdupois pound is approximately 21.53% heavier at 7000 grains, and consists of sixteen avoirdupois ounces).

Troy ounce (oz t) 
A troy ounce weighs 480 grains. Since the implementation of the international yard and pound agreement of 1 July 1959, the grain measure is defined as precisely . Thus one troy ounce =  × /grain = . Since the ounce avoirdupois is defined as 437.5 grains, a troy ounce is exactly  =  or about 1.09714 ounces avoirdupois or about 9.7% more.
The Troy ounce for trading precious metals is considered to be sufficiently approximated by 31.10 g in EU directive 80/181/EEC

Pennyweight (dwt)

The pennyweight symbol is dwt. One pennyweight weighs 24 grains and 20 pennyweights make one troy ounce. Because there were 12 troy ounces in the old troy pound, there would have been 240 pennyweights to the pound (mass) just as there were 240 pennies in the original pound-sterling. The d in dwt stands for denarius, the ancient Roman coin that equates loosely to a penny. The symbol d for penny can be recognized in the form of British pre-decimal pennies, in which pounds, shillings, and pence were indicated using the symbols £, s, and d, respectively.

Troy grain

There is no specific 'troy grain'. All Imperial systems use the same measure of mass called a grain (historically of barley), weighing exactly 64.79891 milligrams.

Mint masses
Mint masses, also known as moneyers' masses were legalized by Act of Parliament dated 17 July 1649 entitled An Act touching the monies and coins of England. A grain is 20 mites, a mite is 24 droits, a droit is 20 perits, a perit is 24 blanks.

Scottish system

In Scotland, the Incorporation of Goldsmiths of the City of Edinburgh used a system in multiples of sixteen. (See Assay-Master's Accounts, 1681–1702, on loan from the Incorporation to the National Archives of Scotland.) There were 16 drops to the troy ounce, 16 ounces to the Scottish troy pound, and 16 pounds to the stone. The Scots had several other ways of measuring precious metals and gems, but this was the common usage for gold and silver.

The Scottish pound was 7,716 grains, but after the union of Scotland with England, was reduced to 7,680 grains. This divides to 16 ounces, each of 16 drops, each of 30 grains. The reduction made the ounce and grain equal in mass to the English standard.

Dutch system
The Dutch troy system is based on a mark of 8 ounces, the ounce of 20 engels (pennyweights), the Engel of 32 as. The mark was rated as 3,798 troy grains or 246.084 grammes. The divisions are identical to the tower system.

Conversions

The troy system was used in the apothecaries' system, but with different further subdivisions.

Relationship to British coinage

King Offa's 8th century currency reform replaced the sceat with the silver penny. This coin was derived from half of a silver dirhem. The masses were then derived by a count of coins, by a mix of Charlemagne and Roman systems. An ounce was set as twenty pence, and a pound to twelve ounces or 240 silver pence. In practice, the weights of the coins was not consistent and 240 of them seldom added up to a full pound; there were no shilling or pound coins and the pound as used only as an accounting convenience.

Later kings debased the coin, both in weight and fineness. The original pound divided was the tower pound of 5,400 grains, but a later pound of 5,760 grains displaced it. Where once 240 pence made a tower pound (and 256 make a troy pound), by the time of the United Kingdom Weights and Measures Act of 1824, a troy pound gives 792 silver pence, still minted as such as Maundy Money.

See also
 Bullion
 Bullion coin
 Carat (unit)
 Conversion of units
 English units
 Fluid ounce
 Grain (unit)
 Imperial units
 Mark (weight)
 Tola (unit)
 United States customary units

Explanatory notes

References

Precious metals
Systems of units
Units of mass
Customary units of measurement in the United States